A list of the earliest films produced in the Cinema of Mexico ordered by year of release from 1896 to 1899. For an alphabetical list of articles on Mexican films see :Category:Mexican films.

1890s
Mexican